Brompton-on-Swale is a village and civil parish in the Richmondshire district of North Yorkshire, England.

History 

The village is mentioned in the Domesday Book as Brunton in lands owned by Count Alan of Brittany. The Count had granted the manor to the constable of Richmond Castle, Enisant Musard after 1086, with the previous lord at the time of the Norman conquest being a local man named Thor, who was listed as a sub-tenant. There were 16 households, 10 ploughlands, an  meadow and a mill. By the late 13th century the manor was in dispute between the Rollos family, who had been granted the manor seized by Henry II, and Roald of Richmond. After the death of William de Rollos, the Crown restored the manor to Roald. Some of the lands at this time were held Robert Lacelles and Peter Greathead and their descendants until sold to Richard le Scrope of Bolton in 1371. By 1380 the lands had been given to the Abbey of St Agatha at nearby Easby, who held the lands until the dissolution. After this, the lands were returned to the Scrope family. By the end of the 19th century, the manorial rights disappeared.

The etymology of the village name is derived from the Old English words brōm, for the shrub Broom, and tūn meaning village or farmstead. The suffix to indicate that the village is located on the River Swale was added later.

The old Roman road of Dere Street runs between the modern road of the A1(M) and A6136.

Brompton-on-Swale was served by Catterick Bridge railway station until 1969; the station house can be seen just outside the village on the B6271 towards Richmond.

Geography and government

The village lies astride the A1(M) road. To the west of the A1(M) is mostly residentially and to the east are business and industrial units with some residential dwellings incorporating the former hamlet of Cittadilla. Two minor roads, the B6272 and the B6271 run east–west through the village. The old route of the A1, now labelled the A6055, runs north–south to the east of the new route.
The villages of Scorton, Catterick, Colburn and Hipswell all lie within  of Brompton-on-Swale.

The section of the A1 road that runs through the village was upgraded to a three-lane motorway as part of the A1 Leeming to Barton Improvement Scheme. The decision to proceed with this was taken by the Chancellor of the Exchequer in December 2012. The work was completed in September 2017 after significant delays in the groundwork and archaeological surveys around the River Swale. The impact on the village will be partial closures to the two bridges on Bridge Road and Station Road for widening work and the removal of direct access from the A6136 north of the village. Access to the north of the village will be at the improved Scotch Corner interchange using the old A1 northbound carriageway. Access to the south of the village will be via the improved Catterick Grade Separated interchange.

The local Parish Council has responsibility for the upkeep of the common land that lies along the riverbank. There is a diverse range of trees including Alder; Ash; Hawthorn; Hazel; Oak; Sycamore; Willow and Wych Elm. Local surveys have also identified several varieties of flowers common to the area that include Bluebell; Celandine; Dogs Mercury; Ramsons; Red Campion; Snowdrop; Stitchwort; Meadow Cransebill; Violets and Wood Anemones.

The village lies within the Richmond (Yorks) UK Parliament constituency. It also lies within the Catterick Bridge electoral division of the North Yorkshire County Council and the Brompton-on-Swale and Scorton ward of Richmondshire District Council. The population of this ward at the 2011 Census was 3,074. The local Parish Council has eight members elected on a four-year cycle.

Demography

2001 Census

According to the 2001 UK Census, the parish was 48.4% male and 51.6% female of the total population of 1,719. The religious make-up was 81.9% Christian alongside a small minority of Buddhists and Hindus, with the rest stating no religion. The ethnic distribution was 98.8% White with rest being a small varied ethnic minority. There were 750 dwellings.

2011 Census

According to the 2011 UK Census, the parish had a total population of 1,879 with 48.4% male and 51.6% female. The religious make-up was 73.3% Christian, a small Jewish, Buddhist, Hindu and Sikh minority with the rest stating no religion. The ethnic distribution was 98% White with a small varied Ethnic minority. There were 859 dwellings.

Community

Brompton-on-Swale Church of England Primary School has around 140 pupils and was opened on the edge of the village in 1983. There are two public houses in Brompton-on-Swale named The Crown and The Farmer's Arms. There used to be a third public house on Station Road named King William IV which is a Grade II listed building. The village has a post office located within the local convenience store. There is a recreation ground with a community sports hall on the south side of the village which is home to the cricket teams. The cricket team play in the Darlington and District Crickety League.

Religion

St Paul's Church in Brompton-on-Swale was built in 1838 as a chapel of ease. It originally had a dual function, serving jointly as a schoolroom in its early days. It is a Grade II listed building. The Methodist chapel was built in 1890 and refurbished in 2007. It is part of the North Yorkshire Dales Methodist Circuit and is a Grade II listed building.

References

External links 

Official village website
Brompton-on-Swale School website

Villages in North Yorkshire
Civil parishes in North Yorkshire
Swaledale